Eduardo Aguilar Estrada (born 6 December 1976 in Puente Genil, Córdoba) is a field hockey midfielder from Spain. He finished in fourth position with the Men's National Team at the 2004 Summer Olympics in Athens, Greece. He made his international senior debut for the national side at the 1997 Champions Trophy in Adelaide, South Australia. Aguilar played club hockey for Atlético San Sebastián.

References
 Spanish Olympic Committee

External links
 

1976 births
Living people
Spanish male field hockey players
Male field hockey midfielders
Olympic field hockey players of Spain
2002 Men's Hockey World Cup players
Field hockey players at the 2004 Summer Olympics
People from Campiña Sur (Córdoba)
Sportspeople from the Province of Córdoba (Spain)